Robert Henry McGregor,  (March 1, 1886 – October 25, 1965) was a long-time Canadian parliamentarian.

MacGregor was a contractor and horticulturalist by profession. He grew up in the Todmorden area of suburban Toronto, and was once an Elementary School student of a teacher named William Thomas Diefenbaker. 
His initial experience in politics began in 1912 when he was appointed a school trustee for York Township. Following the formation of North York Township, he eventually became the first reeve of East York. In 1922, R.H. McGregor Elementary School, located in the eventual centre of East York, was erected and named in his honour.

He was first elected to the House of Commons of Canada in the 1926 federal election and sat continuously in the chamber for thirty-six years until his defeat in the 1962 federal election when he was 79 years old.

Originally elected as the Conservative Member of Parliament for York South, he switched to the new Toronto riding of York East when it was created for the 1935 federal election. He won election a total of eight consecutive times and was Dean of the House of Commons being its longest-serving member in the last years of his career.

Despite his long tenure in the House of Commons he spoke rarely and was nicknamed "Silent Bob" McGregor. His only recorded Parliamentary speech occurred when being feted in the House on his 74th birthday. On that occasion he remarked "If a good many hon. Members made fewer speeches in the House, they would be here longer."

Though never a member of Cabinet, he was elevated to the Queen's Privy Council for Canada on December 21, 1960, on Diefenbaker's recommendation in recognition of McGregor's long tenure of service.

References

External links
 

1886 births
1965 deaths
Canadian people of Scottish descent
Conservative Party of Canada (1867–1942) MPs
Mayors of East York, Ontario
Members of the House of Commons of Canada from Ontario
Members of the King's Privy Council for Canada
Ontario school board trustees
Progressive Conservative Party of Canada MPs